Coal mining is the process of extracting coal from the ground. Coal is valued for its energy content and since the 1880s has been widely used to generate electricity. Steel and cement industries use coal as a fuel for extraction of iron from iron ore and for cement production. In the United Kingdom and South Africa, a coal mine and its structures are a colliery, a coal mine is called a 'pit', and the above-ground structures are a 'pit head'. In Australia, "colliery" generally refers to an underground coal mine.

Coal mining has had many developments in recent years, from the early days of men tunneling, digging and manually extracting the coal on carts to large open-cut and longwall mines. Mining at this scale requires the use of draglines, trucks, conveyors, hydraulic jacks and shearers.

The coal mining industry has a long history of significant negative environmental impacts on local ecosystems, health impacts on local communities and workers, and contributes heavily to the global environmental crises, such as poor air quality and climate change. For these reasons, coal has been one of the first fossil fuels to be phased out of various parts of the global energy economy. The major coal producing countries, though, such as China, Indonesia, India and Australia, have not reached peak production, with production increases replacing falls in Europe and US and proposed mines under development.

History

Methods of extraction
Coal extraction methods vary depending on whether the mine is an underground mine or a surface (also called open cast) mine. Additionally, coal seam thickness and geology are factors in the selection of a mining method. The most economical method of coal extraction for surface mines is the electric shovel or drag line. The most economical form of underground mining is the long wall, which involves using two spinning drums with carbide bits that runs along sections of the coal seam.  Many coals extracted from both surface and underground mines require washing in a coal preparation plant. Technical and economic feasibility are evaluated based on the following: regional geological conditions; overburden characteristics; coal seam continuity, thickness, structure, quality, and depth; strength of materials above and below the seam for roof and floor conditions; topography (especially altitude and slope); climate; land ownership as it affects the availability of land for mining and access; surface drainage patterns; groundwater conditions; availability of labor and materials; coal purchaser requirements in terms of tonnage, quality, and destination; and capital investment requirements.

Surface mining and deep underground mining are the two basic methods of mining.

Coals occurring below  are usually deep mined.

Surface mining

When coal seams are near the surface, it may be economical to extract the coal using open-cut (also referred to as open-cast, open-pit, mountaintop removal or strip) mining methods. Opencast coal mining recovers a greater proportion of the coal deposit than underground methods, as more of the coal seams in the strata may be exploited. This equipment can include the following: Draglines which operate by removing the overburden, power shovels, large trucks in which transport overburden and coal, bucket wheel excavators, and conveyors. In this mining method, explosives are first used in order to break through the surface or overburden, of the mining area. The overburden is then removed by draglines or by shovel and truck. Once the coal seam is exposed, it is drilled, fractured and thoroughly mined in strips. The coal is then loaded onto large trucks or conveyors for transport to either the coal preparation plant or directly to where it will be used.

Most open cast mines in the United States extract bituminous coal. In Canada (BC), Australia and South Africa, open cast mining is used for both thermal and metallurgical coals. In New South Wales open casting for steam coal and anthracite is practiced. Surface mining accounts for around 80 percent of production in Australia, while in the US it is used for about 67 percent of production. Globally, about 40 percent of coal production involves surface mining.

Strip mining
Strip mining exposes coal by removing earth above each coal seam. This earth to be removed is referred to as 'overburden' and is removed in long strips. The overburden from the first strip is deposited in an area outside the planned mining area and referred to as out-of-pit dumping. Overburden from subsequent strips is deposited in the void left from mining the coal and overburden from the previous strip. This is referred to as in-pit dumping.

It is often necessary to fragment the overburden by use of explosives. This is accomplished by drilling holes into the overburden, filling the holes with explosives, and detonating the explosive. The overburden is then removed, using large earth-moving equipment, such as draglines, shovel and trucks, excavator and trucks, or bucket-wheels and conveyors. This overburden is put into the previously mined (and now empty) strip. When all the overburden is removed, the
underlying coal seam will be exposed (a 'block' of coal). This block of coal may be drilled and blasted (if hard) or otherwise loaded onto trucks or conveyors for transport to the coal preparation (or wash) plant. Once this strip is empty of coal, the process is repeated with a new strip being created next to it. This method is most suitable for areas with flat terrain.

Equipment to be used depends on geological conditions. For example, to remove overburden that is loose or unconsolidated, a bucket wheel excavator might be the most productive. The life of some area mines may be more than 50 years.

Contour mining
The contour mining method consists of removing overburden from the seam in a pattern following the contours along a ridge or around the hillside. This method is most commonly used in areas with rolling to steep terrain. It was once common to deposit the spoil on the downslope side of the bench thus created, but this method of spoil disposal consumed much additional land and created severe landslide and erosion problems. To alleviate these problems, a variety of methods were devised to use freshly cut overburden to refill mined-out areas. These haul-back or lateral movement methods generally consist of an initial cut with the spoil deposited downslope or at some other site and spoil from the second cut refilling the first. This barrier adds stability to the reclaimed slope by preventing spoil from slumping or sliding downhill.

The limitations of contour strip mining are both economic and technical. When the operation reaches a predetermined stripping ratio (tons of overburden/tons of coal), it is not profitable to continue. Depending on the equipment available, it may not be technically feasible to exceed a certain height of highwall. At this point, it is possible to produce more coal with the augering method in which spiral drills bore tunnels into a highwall laterally from the bench to extract coal without removing the overburden.

Mountaintop removal mining

Mountaintop coal mining is a surface mining practice involving removal of mountaintops to expose coal seams, and disposing of associated mining overburden in adjacent "valley fills." Valley fills occur in steep terrain where there are limited disposal alternatives.

Mountaintop removal mining combines area and contour strip mining methods. In areas with rolling or steep terrain with a coal seam occurring near the top of a ridge or hill, the entire top is removed in a series of parallel cuts. Overburden is deposited in nearby valleys and hollows. This method usually leaves the ridge and hilltops as flattened plateaus. The process is highly controversial for the drastic changes in topography, the practice of creating head-of-hollow-fills, or filling in valleys with mining debris, and for covering streams and disrupting ecosystems.

Spoil is placed at the head of a narrow, steep-sided valley or hollow. In preparation for filling this area, vegetation and soil are removed and a rock drain constructed down the middle of the area to be filled, where a natural drainage course previously existed. When the fill is completed, this underdrain will form a continuous water runoff system from the upper end of the valley to the lower end of the fill. Typical head-of-hollow fills are graded and terraced to create permanently stable slopes.

Underground mining

Most coal seams are too deep underground for opencast mining and require underground mining, a method that currently accounts for about 60 percent of world coal production. In deep mining, the room and pillar or bord and pillar method progresses along the seam, while pillars and timber are left standing to support the mine roof. Once room and pillar mines have been developed to a stopping point (limited by geology, ventilation, or economics), a supplementary version of room and pillar mining, termed second mining or retreat mining, is commonly started. Miners remove the coal in the pillars, thereby recovering as much coal from the coal seam as possible. A work area involved in pillar extraction is called a pillar section.

Modern pillar sections use remote-controlled equipment, including large hydraulic mobile roof-supports, which can prevent cave-ins until the miners and their equipment have left a work area. The mobile roof supports are similar to a large dining-room table, but with hydraulic jacks for legs. After the large pillars of coal have been mined away, the mobile roof support's legs shorten and it is withdrawn to a safe area. The mine roof typically collapses once the mobile roof supports leave an area.

There are six principal methods of underground mining:
 Longwall mining accounts for about 50 percent of underground production. It is a sophisticated machine with a rotating drum that moves mechanically back and forth across a wide coal seam. The loosened coal falls onto an armored chain conveyor or pan line that takes the coal to the conveyor belt for removal from the work area. Longwall systems have their own hydraulic roof supports which advance with the machine as mining progresses. As the longwall mining equipment moves forward, overlying rock that is no longer supported by coal is allowed to fall behind the operation in a controlled manner. The supports make possible high levels of production and safety. Sensors detect how much coal remains in the seam while robotic controls enhance efficiency. Longwall systems allow a 60-to-100 percent coal recovery rate when surrounding geology allows their use. Once the coal is removed, usually 75 percent of the section, the roof is allowed to collapse in a safe manner.
 Continuous mining utilizes a Continuous Miner Machine with a large rotating steel drum equipped with tungsten carbide picks that scrape coal from the seam. Operating in a "room and pillar" (also known as "bord and pillar") system—where the mine is divided into a series of 20-to-30-foot (5–10 m) "rooms" or work areas cut into the coalbed—it can mine as much as 14 tons of coal a minute, more than a non-mechanised mine of the 1920s would produce in an entire day. Continuous miners account for about 45 percent of underground coal production. Conveyors transport the removed coal from the seam. Remote-controlled continuous miners are used to work in a variety of difficult seams and conditions, and robotic versions controlled by computers are becoming increasingly common. Continuous mining is a misnomer, as room and pillar coal mining is very cyclical. This may be increased with MSHA permission. After the cutting limit is reached, the continuous miner assembly is removed and the roof is supported by the use of a roof bolter, after which the face has to be serviced before it can be advanced again. During servicing, the "continuous" miner moves to another face. Some continuous miners can bolt and rock dust the face (two major components of servicing) while cutting coal, while a trained crew may be able to advance ventilation, to truly earn the "continuous" label. However, very few mines are able to achieve it. Most continuous mining machines in use in the US lack the ability to bolt and dust. This may partly be because the incorporation of bolting makes the machines wider, and therefore, less maneuverable.
 Room and pillar mining consists of coal deposits that are mined by cutting a network of rooms into the coal seam. Pillars of coal are left behind in order to keep up the roof. The pillars can make up to forty percent of the total coal in the seam, however, where there was space to leave the head and floor coal there is evidence from recent open cast excavations that 18th-century operators used a variety of room and pillar techniques to remove 92 percent of the in situ coal. However, this can be extracted at a later stage (see retreat mining).
 Blast mining or conventional mining, is an older practice that uses explosives such as dynamite to break up the coal seam, after which the coal is gathered and loaded onto shuttle cars or conveyors for removal to a central loading area. This process consists of a series of operations that begins with "cutting" the coalbed so it will break easily when blasted with explosives. This type of mining accounts for less than 5 percent of total underground production in the US today.
 Retreat mining is a method in which the pillars or coal ribs used to hold up the mine roof are extracted; allowing the mine roof to collapse as the mining works back towards the entrance. This is one of the most dangerous forms of mining, owing to imperfect predictability of when the roof will collapse and possibly crush or trap workers in the mine.

Production

Coal is mined commercially in over 50 countries. 7,921 million metric tons (Mt) of coal were produced in 2019, a 70% increase over the 20 years since 1999. In 2018, the world production of brown coal (lignite) was 803.2 Mt, with Germany the world's largest producer at 166.3 Mt. China is most likely the second largest producer and consumer of lignite globally although specific lignite production data is not made available.

Coal production has grown fastest in Asia, while Europe has declined. Since 2011, world coal production has been stable, with decreases in Europe and US offset by increases from China, Indonesia and Australia. The top coal mining nations are:

Economic impact 
Globally coal mining is highly concentrated in certain jurisdictions, concentrating much of the social and economic impacts of the industry. Globally the industry directly employs over 7 million workers, which creates millions of indirect jobs. In many parts of the world, producers have reached peak coal as the global economy shifts away from fossil fuels like coal to address climate change. A 2020 study found that renewables jobs could feasibly be created in these geographies to replace many of the coal mining jobs as part of a just transition; however, renewable energy was not suitable in some of the geographies with high concentrations of miners (such as in China).

Waste and refuse

Disasters

Modern mining

The use of sophisticated sensing equipment to monitor air quality is common and has replaced the use of small animals such as canaries, often referred to as "miner's canaries".

In the United States, the increase in technology has significantly decreased the mining workforce. in 2015 US coal mines had 65,971 employees, the lowest figure since EIA began collecting data in 1978. However, a 2016 study reported that a relatively minor investment would allow most coal workers to retrain for the solar energy industry.

Safety

Dangers to miners

Historically, coal mining has been a very dangerous activity and the list of historical coal mining disasters is long. In the US alone, 104,895 coal miners were killed in mine accidents since 1900, 90 percent of the fatalities occurring in the first half of the 20th century. 3,242 died in 1907, the worst year ever; in 2020 there were five.

Open cut hazards are principally mine wall failures and vehicle collisions; underground mining hazards include suffocation, gas poisoning, roof collapse, rock burst, outbursts, and gas explosions.

Firedamp explosions can trigger the much-more-dangerous coal dust explosions, which can engulf an entire mine. Most of these risks are greatly reduced in modern mines, and multiple fatality incidents are now rare in most some parts of the developed world. Modern coal mining in the US has an average 23 deaths per year due to mine accidents (2001–2020).
However, in lesser developed countries and some developing countries, many miners continue to die annually, either through direct accidents in coal mines or through adverse health consequences from working under poor conditions. China, in particular, has the highest number of coal mining related deaths in the world, with official statistics claiming that 6,027 deaths occurred in 2004. To compare, 28 deaths were reported in the US in the same year. Coal production in China is twice that in the US, while the number of coal miners is around 50 times that of the US, making deaths in coal mines in China 4 times as common per worker (108 times as common per unit output) as in the US.

Mine disasters have still occurred in recent years in the US, Examples include the Sago Mine disaster of 2006, and the 2007 mine accident in Utah's Crandall Canyon Mine, where nine miners were killed and six entombed. In the decade 2005–2014, US coal mining fatalities averaged 28 per year. The most fatalities during the 2005–2014 decade were 48 in 2010, the year of the Upper Big Branch Mine disaster in West Virginia, which killed 29 miners.

 
Chronic lung diseases, such as pneumoconiosis (black lung) were once common in miners, leading to reduced life expectancy. In some mining countries black lung is still common, with 4,000 new cases of black lung every year in the US (4 percent of workers annually) and 10,000 new cases every year in China (0.2 percent of workers). The use of water sprays in mining equipment reduces the risk to miners' lungs.
Build-ups of a hazardous gas are known as damps, possibly from the German word  which means steam or vapor:
 Black damp: a mixture of carbon dioxide and nitrogen in a mine can cause suffocation, and is formed as a result of corrosion in enclosed spaces so removing oxygen from the atmosphere.
 After damp: similar to black damp, after damp consists of carbon monoxide, carbon dioxide and nitrogen and forms after a mine explosion.
 Fire damp: consists of mostly methane, a highly flammable gas that explodes between 5% and 15% – at 25% it causes asphyxiation.
 Stink damp: so named for the rotten egg smell of the hydrogen sulfide gas, stink damp can explode and is also very toxic.
 White damp: air containing carbon monoxide which is toxic, even at low concentrations
 A heavy curtain used to direct air currents in mines and prevent the buildup of dangerous gases is known as a damp sheet.

Noise is also a contributing factor to potential adverse effects on coal miners' health. Exposure to excessive noise can lead to noise-induced hearing loss. Hearing loss developed as a result of occupational exposures is coined occupational hearing loss. To protect miners' hearing, the US Mine Safety and Health Administration's (MSHA) guidelines for noise place a Permissible Exposure Limit (PEL) for noise at 90 dBA time-weighted over 8 hours. A lower cutoff, 85 dBA, is set for a worker to fall into the MSHA Action Level which dictates that workers be placed into hearing conservation programs.

Noise exposures vary depending on the method of extraction. For example, a study has found that among surface coal mine operations, dragline equipment produced the loudest sound at a range of 88–112 dBA. Within longwall sections, stageloaders used to transport coal from the mining face and shearers used for extraction represent some of the highest noise exposures.  Auxiliary fans (up to 120 dBA), continuous mining machines (up to 109 dBA), and roof bolters (up to 103 dBA) represent some of the noisiest equipment within continuous mining sections. Exposures to noise exceeding 90 dBA can lead to adverse effects on workers' hearing. The use of administrative controls and engineering controls can be used to reduce noise exposures.

Safety improvements

Improvements in mining methods (e.g. longwall mining), hazardous gas monitoring (such as safety-lamps or more modern electronic gas monitors), gas drainage, electrical equipment, and ventilation have reduced many of the risks of rock falls, explosions, and unhealthy air quality. Gases released during the mining process can be recovered to generate electricity and improve worker safety with gas engines. Another innovation in recent years is the use of closed circuit escape respirators, respirators that contain oxygen for situations where mine ventilation is compromised. Statistical analyses performed by the US Department of Labor's Mine Safety and Health Administration (MSHA) show that between 1990 and 2004, the industry cut the rate of injuries by more than half and fatalities by two-thirds. But according to the Bureau of Labor Statistics, even in 2006, mining remained the second most dangerous occupation in America, when measured by fatality rate. These numbers, however, include all mining activities, and oil and gas mining contribute to the majority of fatalities. Coal mining resulted in 47 fatalities that year. One study, though, has suggested that hazards of modern mining are now more accretive with workers facing long-term health impacts, such as sleep deprivation, that build up over time.

Health and environmental impacts

Coal mining by country

Top 10 hard and brown coal producers in 2012 were (in million metric tons): China 3,621, United States 922, India 629, Australia 432, Indonesia 410, Russia 351, South Africa 261, Germany 196, Poland 144, and Kazakhstan 122.

Australia

Coal has been mined in every state of Australia, but mainly in Queensland, New South Wales and Victoria. It is mostly used to generate electricity, and 75% of annual coal production is exported, mostly to eastern Asia.

In 2007, 428 million tonnes of coal was mined in Australia. In 2007, coal provided about 85% of Australia's electricity production. In the fiscal year 2008/09, 487 million tonnes of coal was mined, and 261 million tonnes was exported. In the fiscal year 2013/14, 430.9 million tonnes of coal was mined, and 375.1 million tonnes was exported. In 2013/14, coal provided about 69% of Australia's electricity production.

In 2013, Australia was the world's fifth-largest coal producer, after China, the United States, India, and Indonesia. However, in terms of proportion of production exported, Australia is the world's second largest coal exporter, as it exports roughly 73% of its coal production. Indonesia exports about 87% of its coal production.

A court in Australia has cited climate change in ruling against a new coal mine.

Canada

Canada was ranked as the 15th coal producing country in the world in 2010, with a total production of 67.9 million tonnes. Canada's coal reserves, the 12th largest in the world, are located largely in the province of Alberta.

The first coal mines in North America were located in Joggins and Port Morien, Nova Scotia, mined by French settlers beginning in the late 1600s. The coal was used for the British garrison at Annapolis Royal, and in the construction of the Fortress of Louisbourg.

Chile

Compared to other South American countries Chile has limited coal resources. Only Argentina is similarly poor. Coal in Chile is mostly sub-bituminous with the exception of the bituminous coals of the Arauco Basin in central Chile.

China

The China is by far the largest producer of coal in the world, producing over 2.8 billion tons of coal in 2007, or approximately 39.8 percent of all coal produced in the world during that year. For comparison, the second largest producer, the United States, produced more than 1.1 billion tons in 2007. An estimated 5 million people work in China's coal-mining industry. As many as 20,000 miners die in accidents each year. Most Chinese mines are deep underground and do not produce the surface disruption typical of strip mines. Although there is some evidence of reclamation of mined land for use as parks, China does not require extensive reclamation and is creating significant acreages of abandoned mined land, which is unsuitable for agriculture or other human uses, and inhospitable to indigenous wildlife. Chinese underground mines often experience severe surface subsidence (6–12 meters), negatively impacting farmland because it no longer drains well. China uses some subsidence areas for aquaculture ponds but has more than they need for that purpose. Reclamation of subsided ground is a significant problem in China. Because most Chinese coal is for domestic consumption, and is burned with little or no air pollution control equipment, it contributes greatly to visible smoke and severe air pollution in industrial areas using coal for fuel. China's total energy uses 67% from coal mines.

Colombia
Some of the world's largest coal reserves are located in South America, and an opencast mine at Cerrejón in Colombia is one of the world's largest open pit mines. The output of the mine in 2004 was 24.9 million tons (compared to total global hard coal production of 4,600 million tons). Cerrejón contributed about half of Colombia's coal exports of 52 million tons that year, with Colombia ranked sixth among major coal exporting nations. The company planned to expand production to 32 million tons by 2008. The company has its own 150 km standard-gauge railroad, connecting the mine to its coal-loading terminal at Puerto Bolívar on the Caribbean coast. There are two 120-car unit trains, each carrying 12,000 tons of coal per trip. The round-trip time for each train, including loading and unloading, is about 12 hours. The coal facilities at the port are capable of loading 4,800 tons per hour onto vessels of up to 175,000 tons of dead weight. The mine, railroad and port operate 24 hours per day. Cerrejón directly employs 4,600 workers, with a further 3,800 employed by contractors. The reserves at Cerrejón are low-sulfur, low-ash, bituminous coal. The coal is mostly used for electric power generation, with some also used in steel manufacture. The surface mineable reserves for the current contract are 330 million tons. However, total proven reserves to a depth of 300 metres are 3,000 million tons.

The expansion of the Cerrejón mine has been blamed for the forced displacement of local communities.

Germany

Germany has a long history of coal mining, going back to the Middle Ages. Coal mining greatly increased during the industrial revolution and the following decades. The main mining areas were around Aachen and the Ruhr area, along with many smaller areas in other parts of Germany, and until 1945 also in Upper Silesia, while the Saarland was repeatedly under French control. These areas grew and were shaped by coal mining and coal processing, and this is still visible even after the end of the coal mining.

Coal mining reached its peak in the first half of the 20th century. After 1950, the coal producers started to struggle financially. In 1975, a subsidy was introduced (Kohlepfennig, coal penny as part of the electricity bill), which was discontinued in the 1990s. In 2007, due to EU regulations, the Bundestag decided to end subsidies by 2018. As a consequence, RAG AG, the owner of the two remaining coal mines in Germany, Prosper Haniel and Ibbenbüren, announced it would close all mines by 2018, thus ended underground coal mining in Germany.

Open pit lignite mining for electricity continues in Nordrhein-Westfalen, and in the eastern states of Brandenburg, Saxony and Saxony-Anhalt.

Greece
Lignite has been mined in Greece since 1873, and today supplies approximately 75% of the country's energy. The main mining areas are located in Western Macedonia (Ptolemaida) and the Peloponnese (Megalopolis).

India

Coal mining in India has a long history of commercial exploitation starting in 1774 with John Sumner and Suetonius Grant Heatly of the East India Company in the Raniganj Coalfield along the Western bank of Damodar River. Demand for coal remained low until the introduction of steam locomotives in 1853. After this, production rose to an annual average of 1 Mt and India produced 6.12 Mt per year by 1900 and 18 Mt per year by 1920, following increased demand in the First World War, but went through a slump in the early thirties. The production reached a level of 29 Mt by 1942 and 30 Mt by 1946. After independence, the country embarked upon five-year development plans. At the beginning of the 1st Plan, annual production went up to 33 Mt. During the 1st Plan period, the need for increasing coal production efficiently by systematic and scientific development of the coal industry was being felt. Setting up the National Coal Development Corporation (NCDC), a Government of India undertaking, in 1956 with the collieries owned by the railways as its nucleus was the first major step towards planned development of Indian Coal Industry. Along with the Singareni Collieries Company Ltd. (SCCL) which was already in operation since 1945 and which became a government company under the control of Government of Andhra Pradesh in 1956, India thus had two Government coal companies in the fifties. SCCL is now a joint undertaking of Government of Telangana and Government of India.

Japan

The richest Japanese coal deposits have been found on Hokkaido and Kyushu.

Japan has a long history of coal mining dating back into the Japanese Middle Ages. It is said that coal was first discovered in 1469 by a farming couple near Ōmuta, central Kyushu. In 1478, farmers discovered burning stones in the north of the island, which led to the exploitation of the Chikuhõ coalfield.

Following Japanese industrialization additional coalfields were discovered northern Japan. One of the first mines in Hokkaido was the Hokutan Horonai coal mine.

New Zealand

Coal mining in New Zealand produced almost 4 million tonnes of coal in 2014, of which 44% was exported. In 2016, production was down to 2,834,956 tonnes.

Poland

Russia
Russia ranked as the fifth largest coal producing country in 2010, with a total production of 316.9 Mt. Russia has the world's second largest coal reserves. Russia and Norway share the coal resources of the Arctic archipelago of Svalbard, under the Svalbard Treaty.

Spain
Spain was ranked as the 30th coal producing country in the world in 2010. The coal miners of Spain were active in the Spanish Civil War on the Republican side. In October 1934, in Asturias, union miners and others suffered a fifteen-day siege in Oviedo and Gijon. There is a museum dedicated to coal mining in the region of Catalonia, called Cercs Mine Museum.

In October 2018, the Sánchez government and Spanish Labour unions settled an agreement to close ten Spanish coal mines at the end of 2018. The government pre-engaged to spend 250 million Euro to pay for early retirements, occupational retraining and structural change. In 2018, about 2,3 per cent of the electric energy produced in Spain was produced in coal-burning power plants.

South Africa

South Africa is one of the ten largest coal producing countries and the fourth largest coal exporting country in the world.

Taiwan

In Taiwan, coal is distributed mainly in the northern area. All of the commercial coal deposits occurred in three Miocene coal-bearing formations, which are the Upper, the Middle and the Lower Coal Measures. The Middle Coal Measures was the most important with its wide distribution, great number of coal beds and extensive potential reserves. Taiwan has coal reserves estimated to be 100–180 Mt. However, coal output had been small, amounting to 6,948 metric tonnes per month from 4 pits before it ceased production effectively in 2000. The abandoned coal mine in Pingxi District, New Taipei, has now turned into the Taiwan Coal Mine Museum.

Turkey

Ukraine

In 2012 coal production in Ukraine amounted to 85.946 million tonnes, up 4.8% from 2011. Coal consumption that same year grew to 61.207 million tonnes, up 6.2% compared with 2011.

More than 90 percent of Ukraine's coal production comes from the Donets Basin. The country's coal industry employs about 500,000 people. Ukrainian coal mines are among the most dangerous in the world, and accidents are common. Furthermore, the country is plagued with extremely dangerous illegal mines.

United Kingdom

United States

Coal was mined in America in the early 18th century, and commercial mining started around 1730 in Midlothian, Virginia.

The American share of world coal production remained steady at about 20 percent from 1980 to 2005, at about 1 billion short tons per year. The United States was ranked as the second highest coal producing country in the world in 2010, and possesses the largest coal reserves in the world. In 2008 then-President George W. Bush stated that coal was the most reliable source of electricity. However, in 2011 President Barack Obama said that the US should rely more on cleaner sources of energy that emit lower or no carbon dioxide pollution. For a time, while domestic coal consumption for electric power was being displaced by natural gas, exports were increasing. US net coal exports increased ninefold from 2006 to 2012, peaked at 117 million short tons in 2012, then declined to 63 million tons in 2015. In 2015, 60% of net US exports went to Europe, 27% to Asia.  US coal production increasingly comes from strip mines in the western United States, such as from the Powder River Basin in Wyoming and Montana.

Coal has come under continued price pressure from natural gas and renewable energy sources, which has resulted in a rapid decline of coal in the U.S. and several notable bankruptcies including Peabody Energy. On 13 April 2016 it reported, that its revenue had reduced by 17 percent as coal prices fell and that it had lost two billion dollars the previous year. It then filed Chapter 11 bankruptcy on 13 April 2016. The Harvard Business Review discussed retraining coal workers for solar photovoltaic employment because of the rapid rise in U.S. solar jobs. A 2016 study indicated that this was technically possible and would account for only 5% of the industrial revenue from a single year to provide coal workers with job security in the energy industry as whole.

Donald Trump pledged to bring back coal jobs during the 2016 US presidential election, and as president he announced plans to reduce environmental protection, particularly by repealing the Clean Power Plan (CPP). However, industry observers have warned that this might not lead to a boom in mining jobs A 2019 projection by the Energy Information Administration estimated that coal production without CPP would decline over coming decades at a faster rate than indicated in the agency's 2017 projection, which had assumed the CPP was in effect.

See also

References

Works cited

Further reading

 Daniel Burns. The modern practice of coal mining (1907)
 Chirons, Nicholas P. Coal Age Handbook of Coal Surface Mining
 
 Hamilton, Michael S. Mining Environmental Policy: Comparing Indonesia and the USA (Burlington, VT: Ashgate, 2005)..
 Grisham, John. "Gray Mountain" (2014) novel set in Appalachia about a fictional legal clinic intern in Virginia coal miningGray Mountain (Grisham novel)
 Hayes, Geoffrey. Coal Mining (2004), 32 pp
 Hughes. Herbert W, A Text-Book of Mining: For the use of colliery managers and others (London, many editions 1892–1917), the standard British textbook for its era.
 Kuenzer, Claudia. Coal Mining in China (In: Schumacher-Voelker, E., and Mueller, B., (Eds.), 2007: BusinessFocus China, Energy: A Comprehensive Overview of the Chinese Energy Sector. gic Deutschland Verlag, 281 pp.,  pp. 62–68)
 
 Charles V. Nielsen and George F. Richardson. 1982 Keystone Coal Industry Manual (1982)
 Saleem H. Ali. "Minding our Minerals, 2006."
 A.K. Srivastava. Coal Mining Industry in India (1998)
 Tonge, James. The principles and practice of coal mining (1906)
 Woytinsky, W. S., and E. S. Woytinsky. World Population and Production Trends and Outlooks (1953) pp 840–881; with many tables and maps on the worldwide coal industry in 1950
 Zola, Émile, Germinal (novel, 1885)

External links

 Glossary of Mining Terms
 Global Coal Mine Tracker, Global Energy Monitor
 Coal Mine exploration and preservation
 Abandoned Mine Research
 Methods of mining – overview and graphic of coal mining methods
 Coal Mining in the British Isles (Northern Mine Research Society)
 National Coal Mining Museum for England
 NIOSH Coal Workers' Health Surveillance Program
 Purdue University – Petroleum and Coal
 University of Wollongong – educational resource on longwall mining
 Virtual coalmine  – visual e-learning source with comprehensive display of long-wall face
 World Coal Institute – Coal Mining

 
Fuel production